The 1973 Victorian state election, held on Saturday, 19 May 1973, was for the 46th Parliament of Victoria. It was held in the Australian state of Victoria to elect the 73 members of the state's Legislative Assembly and 18 members of the 36-member Legislative Council.

Rupert Hamer succeeded Henry Bolte as Premier of Victoria on 23 August 1972. In 1972 a federal Labor government was elected, the first Labor government in 23 years. The incumbent Liberal government in Victoria led by Hamer was returned at the election with an increased vote of about 5%, largely at the expense of the Democratic Labor Party.

Results

Legislative Assembly

|}

Legislative Council

|}

Seats changing hands

 The result for Greensborough was overturned by the Court of Disputed Returns and a by-election was called.

Post-election pendulum

See also
Candidates of the 1973 Victorian state election

References

1973 elections in Australia
Elections in Victoria (Australia)
1970s in Victoria (Australia)
May 1973 events in Australia